Liolaemus araucaniensis is a species of lizard in the family  Liolaemidae. It is native to Chile and Argentina.

References

araucaniensis
Reptiles described in 1932
Reptiles of Argentina
Reptiles of Chile
Taxa named by Lorenz Müller
Taxa named by Walter Hellmich